A sinkhole is a hole in the earth's surface caused by a collapse in the soil or bedrock.

It can also refer to:

Sinkhole (film), a 2021 South Korean disaster comedy film
Battle of the Sink Hole, a battle in the War of 1812
Drain (plumbing), a hole in a sink for draining
DNS sinkhole, a DNS server that points a domain to bogus internet addresses